A culture hero is a mythological hero specific to some group (cultural, ethnic, religious, etc.) who changes the world through invention or discovery. A typical culture hero might be credited as the discoverer of fire, or agriculture, songs, tradition, law or religion, and is usually the most important legendary figure of a people, sometimes as the founder of its ruling dynasty.

Abenaki mythology
 Bedig-wajo (southern)
 Glooscap
 Ktaden (western)

Ainu mythology
 Ae-oyna-kamuy

Australian Aboriginal mythology
 Bunjil
 I'wai
 Wurrunna

Abrahamic mythology (Judaism, Christianity, Islam)
 Abraham
 Adam
 Moses
 Noah
 Ben
 Elijah
 The Prodigal Son
 Jesus

Armenian mythology
 Anahit
 Aramazd
 Hayk
 Vahagn

Ashanti mythology
 Anansi

Aztec mythology
 Ce Acatl Topiltzin
 Quetzalcoatl

Banks Islands mythology
 Qat

Buddhist mythology
 Avalokiteśvara/Guanyin
 Bodhisattvas
 Buddha
 Kṣitigarbha
 Maitreya
 Mañjuśrī
 Śakra

Caroline Islands mythology
 Isokelekel

Celtic mythology (Irish, Welsh, Scottish)
 King Arthur (Also English/British)
 Bendigeidfran (Welsh)
 Cúchulainn (Irish)
 Diarmuid Ua Duibhne (Irish)
 Fionn mac Cumhail (Finn McCool) (Irish)
 Gwydion (Welsh)
 Lugh (Irish) or Lleu Llaw Gyffes (Welsh)
 Oisín (Irish)
 Pryderi (Welsh)
 Pwyll (Welsh)

Chinese mythology
 Fuxi & Nüwa (first people)
 Suiren (fire)
 Shennong (agriculture, tea, & medicine)
 Shujun (animal husbandry)
 Zhuanxu (sacrifice)
 Chiyou (metal weaponry & Chinese wrestling)
 Ling Lun & Kui (music)
 Yellow Emperor (elegant clothing, zithers, mathematics, astronomy & time-keeping, chariots, kung fu, Chinese culture generally)
 Leizu (silk)
 Cangjie (writing) 
 Ning Feng (pottery)
 Hui (Huī) and Yimou (Yímóu, archery)
 Yao & Shun (ideal rulership)
 Yu the Great (flood control)
 Duke of Zhou, Confucius, & Mencius (classic texts)
 Zhang Sanfeng (Tai Chi)

Egyptian mythology
 Anubis
 Bast
 Bes
 Horus
 Isis
 Menes
 Osiris
 Ptah-hotep
 Ra
 Set
 Thoth

English mythology
 King Arthur (Also Celtic)
 Beowulf
 Hengist and Horsa
 Lud son of Heli (Also Celtic)
 Robin Hood
 Sceafa

Etruscan mythology
 Tarchon
 Tyrrhenus

Finnish mythology
 Ilmarinen
 Lemminkäinen
 Väinämöinen

Germanic mythology

Greek mythology
 Abderus
 Achilles
 Aeneas
 Ajax the Great
 Ajax the Lesser
 Amphitryon
 Antilochus
 Bellerophon
 Cadmus
 Castor and Pollux
 Cecrops
 Chrysippus
 Daedalus
 Diomedes
 Eleusis
 Eunostus
 Ganymede
 Hektor
 Heracles
 Icarus
 Iolaus
 Jason
 Lycaon (king of Arcadia)
 Meleager
 Odysseus (Ulysses)
 Orpheus
 Palamedes
 Pandion
 Perseus
 Phoroneus
 Prometheus
 Theseus
 Triptolemos
 Zeus

Hungarian mythology
 Álmos
 Hunor and Magor

Inca mythology
 Manco Cápac
 Viracocha

Indian mythology
 Arjuna
 Barbarika
 Bharat
 Bhima
 Bhishma
 Draupadi
 Guru Nanak
 Hanuman
 Harishchandra
 Karna
 Krishna
 Mahavira
 Manu
 Mamuni Mayan
 Meghnad
 Nakul
 Parashurama
 Rama
 Rishabha
 Sahadeva
 King Shivi
 Sita
 Vikramaditya
 Yudhishthira

Ho-Chunk mythology
 Red Horn

Inuit mythology
 Apanuugak
 Kiviuq

Japanese mythology
 Amaterasu
 Ame-no-tajikarao
 Fujiwara no Hidesato
 Izanagi
 Izanami
 Emperor Jimmu
 Empress Jingū
 Kibitsuhiko-no-mikoto
 Kintarō
 Kotoshironushi
 Minamoto no Yorimitsu
 Minamoto no Yoshimitsu
 Minamoto no Yoshitsune
 Minamoto no Yoshiie
 Miyamoto Musashi
 Momotarō
 Nomi no Sukune
 Emperor Ōjin (Hachiman)
 Ōkuninushi
 Ōmononushi
 Ono no Komachi
 Sakanoue no Tamuramaro
 Susanoo
 Taira no Sadamori
 Takemikazuchi
 Takeminakata
 Takenouchi no Sukune
 Takezaki Suenaga
 Takeda Shingen
 Tsukuyomi
 Ukanomitama (Inari Ōkami)
 Urabe no Suetake
 Urashima Tarō (Urashima-no-ko)
 Usui Sadamitsu
 Watanabe no Tsuna
 Watatsumi
 Yamato Takeru

Lakota mythology
 Iktomi

Maya mythology
 Gukumatz
 Kukulkan
 Maya Hero Twins
 Maya maize god

Mesopotamian mythology
 Enkidu
 Gilgamesh
 Ziusudra

Navajo mythology
 Changing Woman
 The Diyin Dine

Norse mythology
 Arngrim
 Bödvar Bjarki
 Egil
 Helgi
 Hothbrodd
 Loki
 Odin
 Ragnar Lodbrok
 Sigurd Fafnersbane
 Starkad
 Svipdagr
 Thor
 Vili and Vé

Ohlone mythology
 Kaknu

Ojibwe mythology
 Nanabozho

Persian mythology
 Arash
 Babak Khorramdin
 Esfandiyār
 Fereydun
 Garshasp
 Giv
 Kaveh the Blacksmith
 Rostam
 Sām
 Siyâvash
 Sohrab
 Zoroaster

Polynesian mythology
 Atonga
 Māui
 Tangaroa

Roman mythology
 Aeneas
 Evander of Pallene
 Hercules
 Janus
 Marcus
 Romulus and Remus
 Romulus/Quirinus
 Silvius

Serbian mythology
 Saint Sava
Thracian horseman
Svevlad

Slavic mythology
 Alyosha Popovich
 Dažbog
 Dobrynya Nikitich
 Ilya Muromets
 Ivan Tsarevich
 Juraj Jánošík
 Krakus
 Mikula Selyaninovich
 Misizla
 Nikita
 Vasily Buslayev
 Volga Svyatoslavich

Solomon Islands mythology
 To-Kabinana

Talamancan mythology
 Sibú

Ugarit mythology
 Danel

Ute mythology
 Cin-an-ev

Vietnamese mythology
 Au Co
 Chử Đồng Tử
 Đam San
 Lac Long Quan
 Thanh Giong
 Thach Sanh
 Trạng Quỳnh
 Sơn Tinh

Weenhayek mythology
 Ahutsetajwaj
 Tapiatsa

Zuni mythology
 Ahayuta
 Awonawilona

See also
 Culture Hero
 List of folk heroes

References 

Mythology
Cultural lists